Events from the year 1902 in France.

Incumbents
President: Émile Loubet
President of the Council of Ministers: Pierre Waldeck-Rousseau (until 3 June), Emile Combes (starting 7 June)

Events
13 April – A new car speed record of 74 mph is set in Nice, by Leon Serpollet.
27 April – Legislative Election held.
11 May – Legislative Election held.

Arts and literature
January - Alfred Loisy writes L'évangile et l'Eglise, which inaugurates the Modernist Crisis.
George Melies performs play Voyage to the Moon (Le Voyage dans la Lune)

Births

January–June
11 January – Maurice Duruflé, composer and organist (died 1986)
13 January – Raymond Ruyer, philosopher (died 1987)
18 January – Émile Aillaud, architect (died 1988)
25 January – André Beaufre, colonel (died 1975)
29 January – Arlette Marchal, actress (died 1984)
8 February – André Gillois, writer and radio pioneer (died 2004)
26 February – Jean Bruller, writer and illustrator (died 1991)
9 March – Elisabeth de Rothschild, World War II heroine (died 1945)
13 March – Louis Ducatel, politician and businessman (died 1999)
14 March – Henri Barbé, communist (died 1966)
16 March – Louis Couffignal, mathematician and cybernetics pioneer (died 1966)
22 March – Madeleine Milhaud, actress (died 2008)
29 March – Marcel Aymé, novelist and children's writer (died 1967)
4 April – Louise Leveque de Vilmorin, novelist, poet and journalist (died 1969)
9 April – Théodore Monod, naturalist, explorer and humanist scholar (died 2000)
3 May – Alfred Kastler, physicist, Nobel Prize laureate (died 1984)
7 May – Jean-Philippe Lauer, architect and Egyptologist (died 2001)
8 May – André Michel Lwoff, microbiologist, awarded Nobel Prize in Medicine in 1965 (died 1994)
27 May – Émile Benveniste, structural linguist (died 1976)
2 June – Georges Coudray, politician (died 1998)
15 June – Pierre Béarn, writer (died 2004)
28 June – Pierre Brunet, figure skater (died 1991)

July–December
6 July – Louis Vola, double bass player (died 1990)
16 July – Vincent Badie, lawyer and politician (died 1989)
9 August – Zino Francescatti, violinist (died 1991)
11 August – Christian de Castries, military officer (died 1991)
16 August – Gilbert Gérintès, rugby union player (died 1968)
24 August – Fernand Braudel, historian (died 1985)
28 August – Jean Favard, mathematician (died 1965)
15 October – André Prudhommeaux, anarchist bookstore owner (died 1968)
20 October – René Floriot, lawyer (died 1975).
31 October – Marie-Laure de Noailles, patron of the arts (died 1970)
4 November – Pierre Edouard Leopold Verger, photographer and ethnographer (died 1996)
16 November – Paul Bontemps, athlete and Olympic medallist (died 1981)
20 November – Jean Painlevé, film director (died 1989)
31 December – Marcel Bidot, cyclist (died 1995)

Full date unknown
Jules Semler-Collery, composer, conductor and teacher (died 1988)

Deaths
26 January- Noël Ballay, explorer, colonial administrator and poet (born 1847])
6 February – Clémence Royer, scholar (born 1830)
17 February – Marie-Louise Gagneur, feminist (born 1832)
12 April – Marie Alfred Cornu, physicist (born 1841)
15 April – Jules Dalou, sculptor (born 1838)
4 July – Hervé Faye, astronomer (born 1814)
8 August – James Tissot, painter (born 1836)
29 September – Émile Zola, writer (born 1840)
7 December – Pierre Paul Dehérain, chemist and botanist (born 1830)

Full date unknown
Alexandre Bertrand, archaeologist (born 1820)

See also
 List of French films before 1910

References

1900s in France